HD 82741 is a single star in the northern constellation of Lynx. It is visible to the naked eye with an apparent visual magnitude of 4.81. It is moving further from the Earth with a heliocentric radial velocity of 1 km/s.

It belongs to a sub-category of giants called the red clump, indicating that it is on the horizontal branch and is generating energy through the fusion of helium at its core. With 1.62 times the mass of the Sun, it has expanded to 11 times the Sun's radius. It is radiating 58.9 times the Sun's luminosity from its enlarged photosphere at an effective temperature of 4,809 K.

References

G-type giants
Horizontal-branch stars
Lynx (constellation)
Durchmusterung objects
082741
047029
3809